Coward is a surname. Notable people with the surname include:

Charles Coward (1905–1976), English soldier captured during World War II who claimed to have rescued Jews from Auschwitz
Chris Coward (born 1989), English football player
Dena Coward, 21st century Canadian sports event coordinator
Herbert Coward (born 1938), American actor
John Coward (ice hockey) (1910–1989), British ice hockey player, member of the gold medal team at the 1936 Olympics
John Coward (Royal Navy officer) (born 1937), British retired vice-admiral
John Coward, first officer of British Airways Flight 38 which crashed at Heathrow in 2008
Michael Coward (1945–2003), British geologist
Mike Coward (born 1946), Australian sports writer
Noël Coward (1899–1973), English actor, playwright, and composer of popular music 
Pamela Coward, British educator and teacher
Thomas Coward (1867–1933), English ornithologist and amateur astronomer
William Coward (1657?–1725), English physician, controversial writer, and poet
William Coward (merchant) (1648–1738), London merchant and supporter of Dissenters
William Coward (pirate), minor English pirate

Etymology
As a surname (attested from mid-13c.) it represents Old English cuhyrde "cow-herd."

See also
Cowart

References

Occupational surnames